Abraham Kruger  (February 14, 1885 – July 4, 1962) was an American pitcher in Major League Baseball. He appeared in two games for the 1908  Brooklyn Superbas, starting one game and finishing with a 0-1 record in 6.1 innings of work.

External links

1885 births
1962 deaths
Baseball players from Pennsylvania
Major League Baseball pitchers
Brooklyn Superbas players
Uniontown Coal Barons players